Home Gardens is a census-designated place (CDP) in Riverside County, California, United States. It is within the City of Corona's sphere of influence. The population was 11,203 at the 2020 census, down from 11,507 at the 2010 census.

Geography
Home Gardens is located at  (33.879450, -117.511951).

Demographics

2010
At the 2010 census Home Gardens had a population of 11,570. The racial makeup of Home Gardens was 5,275 (45.6%) White, 364 (3.1%) African American, 126 (1.1%) Native American, 667 (5.8%) Asian, 51 (0.4%) Pacific Islander, 4,500 (38.9%) from other races, and 587 (5.1%) from two or more races. Hispanic or Latino of any race were 8,524 persons (73.7%).

The census reported that 11,562 people (99.9% of the population) lived in households, 8 (0.1%) lived in non-institutionalized group quarters, and no one was institutionalized.

There were 2,760 households, 1,553 (56.3%) had children under the age of 18 living in them, 1,687 (61.1%) were opposite-sex married couples living together, 434 (15.7%) had a female householder with no husband present, 215 (7.8%) had a male householder with no wife present. There were 172 (6.2%) unmarried opposite-sex partnerships, and 17 (0.6%) same-sex married couples or partnerships. 306 households (11.1%) were one person and 123 (4.5%) had someone living alone who was 65 or older. The average household size was 4.19. There were 2,336 families (84.6% of households); the average family size was 4.35.

The age distribution was 3,618 people (31.3%) under the age of 18, 1,404 people (12.1%) aged 18 to 24, 3,358 people (29.0%) aged 25 to 44, 2,328 people (20.1%) aged 45 to 64, and 862 people (7.5%) who were 65 or older. The median age was 29.3 years. For every 100 females, there were 107.6 males.  For every 100 females age 18 and over, there were 104.4 males.

There were 2,865 housing units at an average density of 1,841.3 per square mile, of the occupied units 1,952 (70.7%) were owner-occupied and 808 (29.3%) were rented. The homeowner vacancy rate was 2.3%; the rental vacancy rate was 2.5%. 7,749 people (67.0% of the population) lived in owner-occupied housing units and 3,813 people (33.0%) lived in rental housing units.

2000
At the 2000 census there were 9,461 people, 2,302 households, and 1,952 families in the CDP. The racial makeup of the CDP was 47.9% White, 3.4% Black or African American, 1.3% Native American, 4.6% Asian, 0.2% Pacific Islander, 38.1% from other races, and 4.5% from two or more races. 66.5% of the population were Hispanic or Latino of any race.
Of the 2,302 households 49.5% had children under the age of 18 living with them, 66.2% were married couples living together, 11.8% had a female householder with no husband present, and 15.2% were non-families. 10.9% of households were one person and 4.2% were one person aged 65 or older. The average household size was 4.11 and the average family size was 4.30.

The age distribution was 35.1% under the age of 18, 11.4% from 18 to 24, 30.7% from 25 to 44, 16.0% from 45 to 64, and 6.8% 65 or older. The median age was 27 years. For every 100 females, there were 105.0 males. For every 100 females age 18 and over, there were 104.5 males.

The median household income was $47,535 and the median family income  was $49,229. Males had a median income of $30,859 versus $22,130 for females. The per capita income for the CDP was $14,181. About 8.8% of families and 11.2% of the population were below the poverty line, including 14.7% of those under age 18 and 3.9% of those age 65 or over.

Government

Municipal
In the Riverside County Board of Supervisors, Home Gardens is in the Second District, represented by Karen Spiegel.

State
In the California State Legislature, Home Gardens is located in the 31st Senate District, represented by Democrat Richard Roth, and in the 60th Assembly District, represented by Democrat Sabrina Cervantes.

Federal
Democrats Dianne Feinstein and Alex Padilla represent California in the United States Senate.

Education
The western portion of Home Gardens is under the jurisdiction of the Corona-Norco Unified School District. Home Gardens Elementary School on 13550 Tolton Avenue is the primary and only school in the Home Gardens unincorporated area.

Current zoning for graduates from Home Gardens Elementary are directed to Citrus Hills Intermediate School in Corona. From Citrus Hills Intermediate, graduates are then directed to Santiago High School, also in Corona.

The eastern portion of Home Gardens is under the jurisdiction of the Alvord Unified School District, which also serves portions of Riverside and Corona. Home Gardens students there are currently zoned to Promenade Elementary School in Corona, Ysmael Villegas Middle School in Riverside and Hillcrest High School, also in Riverside.  

The Riverside County Library System offers local residents a branch on 3785 Neece Street. The YMCA is active in both the elementary school and library.

Students who live in Home Gardens fall within the Riverside Community College District. The District's nearest campus is Norco College at 2001 3rd Street in Norco, and the Riverside City College campus is also nearby, located on Magnolia Avenue in Riverside.

References

Census-designated places in Riverside County, California
Census-designated places in California